På begäran was released on 3 January 1992 and is a compilation album from Swedish "dansband" Lotta & Anders Engbergs Orkester. Some songs on the album are Lotta Engberg solo.

Track listing
Fyra Bugg & en Coca Cola
Tusen vackra bilder
Världens bästa servitris
En gång till
Skön Cecilia
Yakety Sax
Melodin
På min sommaräng (My Boy Lollipop)
100%
Succéschottis
True Love
Kan man gifta sig i jeans?
Brevet från Maria på Öland
Genom vatten och eld
Så många barn
Två ska man va' (I'm Gonna Knock on Your Door)

References

1992 compilation albums
Lotta & Anders Engbergs orkester albums